2005–06 Országos Bajnokság I (men's water polo) was the 100th water polo championship in Hungary.

First stage 

Pld - Played; W - Won; L - Lost; PF - Points for; PA - Points against; Diff - Difference; Pts - Points.

Championship Playoff

European competition Playoff

Relegation Playoff

Sources 
Magyar sportévkönyv 2007

Seasons in Hungarian water polo competitions
Hungary
2005 in water polo
2005 in Hungarian sport
2006 in water polo
2006 in Hungarian sport